Mount Wilson is a  mountain summit located in the North Saskatchewan River valley of Banff National Park, in the Canadian Rockies of Alberta, Canada. Its nearest higher peak is Mount Cline,  to the northeast. Mount Wilson is situated immediately north of the confluence of the North Saskatchewan River, Mistaya River, and Howse River near Saskatchewan Crossing, where the Icefields Parkway intersects with the David Thompson Highway.

History

Mount Wilson honours Tom Wilson (1859–1933) who was an early explorer in the Canadian Rockies. The mountain was named in 1898 by Norman Collie. The first ascent of the mountain was made in 1902 by James Outram and Christian Kaufmann. The mountain's name was officially adopted in 1924 by the Geographical Names Board of Canada.

Geology

Like other mountains in Banff Park, Mount Wilson is composed of sedimentary rock laid down from the Precambrian to Jurassic periods. Formed in shallow seas, this sedimentary rock was pushed east and over the top of younger rock during the Laramide orogeny. The west and south aspects of the mountain are characterized by rugged, rocky cliff bands, whereas the north and east aspects of Mount Wilson are covered by expansive glacial ice called the Wilson Icefield.

Climate

Based on the Köppen climate classification, Mount Wilson is located in a subarctic climate zone with cold, snowy winters, and mild summers. Temperatures can drop below −20 °C (−4 °F) with wind chill factors below −30 °C (−22 °F). Weather conditions during winter make Mount Wilson one of the premier places in the Rockies for ice climbing. Precipitation runoff from Mount Wilson drains into tributaries of the Saskatchewan River.

Ice Climbing Routes
Ice Climbing Routes with grades on Mount Wilson:

 Dancing With Chaos – WI6
 Midnight Rambler  – WI3
 Wilson Major – WI3-6
 Lady Wilson's Right Tit – WI4
 Lady Wilson's Cleavage – WI3
 Totem Pole – WI5
 Living in Paradise – WI6+
 Suntori – WI6
 Skinny Puppy – WI5
 Phil Spectre's Nightmare – WI6
 Mixed Monster – M8 WI5+

See also
List of mountains of Canada
Geography of Alberta

Gallery

References

External links

 Parks Canada web site: Banff National Park
 Mount Wilson weather: Mountain Forecast

Three-thousanders of Alberta
Mountains of Banff National Park
Canadian Rockies
Alberta's Rockies